The 1950–51 season was Manchester United's 49th season in the Football League. The club finished runners-up to champions Tottenham Hotspur in the league and were also quarter-finalists in the FA Cup.

A notable debutant for the club this season was 17-year-old Barnsley born centre-half Mark Jones.

First Division

FA Cup

Squad statistics

References

Manchester United F.C. seasons
Manchester United